Georges Guillet (1624 - 6 April 1705) was a French scholar, writer and actor, also known by his stage name Guillet de Saint-George, which he first took in 1661.

He was born in Thiers and was the first person to write a history of the Académie royale de peinture et de sculpture. He also wrote accounts of travels to the Levant under the pen-name "Sieur de La Guilletière". He died in Paris.

Works 
 Lacédémone ancienne et nouvelle, 1676, republished 1979.
 Arts de l'homme d'épée ou le dictionnaire du gentilhomme, 1678. Three volumes. In 1705, the 16th French edition was translated into English and refashioned for an English audience; it was published as The Gentleman's Dictionary.
 Histoire du règne de Mahomet II, 1681.

Sources
http://data.bnf.fr/11906420/georges_guillet_de_saint-george/

Members of the Académie royale de peinture et de sculpture
17th-century French historians
People from Thiers
1625 births
1705 deaths
17th-century French male actors
French male stage actors
French travel writers